HOCO or hoco or HoCo may refer to:

 Hydrocarboxyl, in chemistry, an unstable molecular radical important in combustion
 Howard County, Maryland, informal abbreviation for the U.S. county
Homecoming